Mei is a 2019 Indian Tamil-language medical thriller film written and directed by SA Baskaran in his directorial debut. The film stars newcomer Nicky Sundaram and Aishwarya Rajesh in the lead roles, while Kishore, Charle, Ajay Ghosh, and Vinod Krishnan play supporting roles. The film is based on the real story relating to medical mafias in India. The film is produced under the production banner Sundaram Productions. The songs for the film were composed by Prithvi Kumar. The film was released on 23 August 2019.

Plot 
The missing case of a young girl unfolds mystery behind several hidden crimes related to a medical racket as investigation continues.

Abhinav Chandran (Nicky Sundaram), an aspiring doctor who returned from the US, is chased by police when a medical racket alleges him for the reason behind the death of a medical shop employee. He is assisted by medical representative Uthra (Aishwarya Rajesh).

Cast 

 Nicky Sundaram as Dr. Abhinav Chandran
 Aishwarya Rajesh as Uthra
 Kishore as Muthukrishnan
 Charle as Narmadha's father
 Ajay Ghosh as Karunakaran 
 Vinod Krishnan as Dr. Jayanth
 Kavithalaya Krishnan as Manager
 E. Ramdoss as Police officer
 George Maryan as Gopi
 Aroul D. Shankar as Doctor
 Abhishek Vinod 
 Gowthami Vembunathan as Hostel Warden
 Tigergarden Thangadurai as Gopi's friend
 K. S. G. Venkatesh as Shanti's father

Soundtrack
Soundtrack was composed by New York-based composer Prithvi Kumar and received widely positive reviews from leading media sources including BBC Radio, The Times of India, The Hindu and The Indian Express.
"Maalaiye" - Prithvi Kumar
"Kaatre Silamurai" - Prithvi Kumar
"Maayavalai" - Prithvi Kumar, Sanjana Raja

Reception
The Hindu wrote "As the title suggests, Mei is about finding the truth behind The Curious Case of A Missing Girl. But it’s a weakly-scripted movie that doesn’t quite take off." Times of India wrote "The story and characters look too good on paper with some twists and a few engaging sequences. [..] However, the making of a slick thriller like this could have been more gripping as it lacks any sharp cuts or edge of the seat moments". The New Indian Express wrote "One of the oft-used conclusions drawn about a middling movie is that it has its heart in the right place. Unfortunately, for Mei, a film based on organ trafficking, I can’t quite say that". Sify wrote "Overall,  ‘Mei’ is a watchable thriller for the research work done by the young team, the strong supporting cast and the crisp run time".

References

External links 

 

2019 directorial debut films
2019 films
Indian crime thriller films
2019 crime thriller films
2010s Tamil-language films
Indian films based on actual events
Films about organ trafficking